Mecysmauchenius is a genus of spiders in the Mecysmaucheniidae family. It was first described in 1884 by Simon. , it contains 17 species.

Species
Mecysmauchenius comprises the following species:
Mecysmauchenius canan Forster & Platnick, 1984
Mecysmauchenius chacamo Forster & Platnick, 1984
Mecysmauchenius chapo Forster & Platnick, 1984
Mecysmauchenius chepu Forster & Platnick, 1984
Mecysmauchenius chincay Forster & Platnick, 1984
Mecysmauchenius eden Forster & Platnick, 1984
Mecysmauchenius fernandez Forster & Platnick, 1984
Mecysmauchenius gertschi Zapfe, 1960
Mecysmauchenius newtoni Forster & Platnick, 1984
Mecysmauchenius osorno Forster & Platnick, 1984
Mecysmauchenius platnicki Grismado & Ramírez, 2005
Mecysmauchenius puyehue Forster & Platnick, 1984
Mecysmauchenius segmentatus Simon, 1884
Mecysmauchenius termas Forster & Platnick, 1984
Mecysmauchenius thayerae Forster & Platnick, 1984
Mecysmauchenius victoria Forster & Platnick, 1984
Mecysmauchenius villarrica Forster & Platnick, 1984

References

Mecysmaucheniidae
Araneomorphae genera
Spiders of South America